Attorney General Nesbitt may refer to:

Charles R. Nesbitt (1921–2007), Attorney General of Oklahoma
William Nesbitt (Nova Scotia politician) ( 1707–1784),  Attorney General of the Colony of Nova Scotia